The Islamic Network (T.I.N.) is a local cable television station in Trinidad and Tobago broadcasting Islamic programming. The station is carried on Channel 96 or 116 on the Flow Trinidad cable system.

References

External links
 Official Website

Television stations in Trinidad and Tobago
Islamic television networks